Mark Takeshi McGregor is a Canadian flutist, educator, producer, curator, and visual artist.

Early life and education 
McGregor was born in Richmond, British Columbia, and grew up in North Delta, British Columbia. He received his Bachelor of Music degree from the University of British Columbia in 1995; the Concours de Musique from le Conservatoire de musique du Québec à Montréal in 1997; Master of Music from the University of Sydney, Australia, where he studied with Margaret Crawford and Richard Toop; (thesis topic: Evolution of extended techniques in the flute music of Brian Ferneyhough); and Doctorate of Musical Arts from the University of British Columbia in 2012, where his thesis topic was  Of Instrumental Value: Composer-performer collaboration in the creation of avant-garde flute music, and notably includes the first overview of the performance career of Severino Gazzelloni written in the English language, as well as an in-depth interview with renowned Canadian flutist Robert Aitken and writings about McGregor's collaborations with three contemporary Canadian composers.

Career

Artistic director, curator, and producer 
In 2001, Jordan Nobles and Mark Takeshi McGregor co-founded of Vancouver's Redshift Music Society, an organization founded in 2001 which commissions and premieres new works by Canadian and international composers. McGregor was co-artistic director along with Nobles from 2005 to 2012 and helped launch the Redshift Records label, which released its first CD in 2007. McGregor has been featured on, and produced, a number of their 40 releases, which feature the music of contemporary Canadian and international composers.

McGregor was the Artistic Director of Powell Street Festival Society in Vancouver, Canada from 2015 to 2016. In 2021 he succeeded S.D. Holman as artistic director and executive director of the Queer Arts Festial in Vancouver.

Performer 
Mark Takeshi McGregor has premiered flute concertos by Gordon Fitzell, Anna Höstman, James Beckwith Maxwell, and Piotr Grella-Mozejko, and has commissioned and premiered dozens solo and chamber music by dozens of contemporary Canadian and international composers, including Pedro Alvarez, Dániel Péter Biró, Philip Brownlee, Jennifer Butler, Dorothy Chang, André Cormier, Michael Finnissy, Graham Flett, Patrick Giguère, Etsuko Hori, Kaiyi Kao, Yota Kobayashi, Chris Kovarik, Emilie LeBel, Hope Lee, Ellen Lindquist, Nicole Lizée, Simon Martin, Cassandra Miller, Jocelyn Morlock, Gregory Lee Newsome, Jordan Nobles, Anders Nordentoft, James O’Callaghan, Michael Oesterle, Nova Pon, Marci Rabe, Benton Roark, Jeffrey Ryan, Farshid Samandari, Alfredo Santa Ana, Rodney Sharman, Paul Steenhuisen, Edward Top, Hiroki Tsurumoto, and Owen Underhill. He is most frequently heard in concert as soloist, with Rachel Kiyo Iwaasa as the Tiresias Duo, and as flutist for the Victoria-based new music ensemble, Aventa.

Educator 
Until 2021 Mark Takeshi McGregor was instructor of flute at the VSO School of Music,  the Vancouver Academy of Music, and Vancouver Community College. He served as sessional faculty (flute) at the University of Victoria in 2016.

Selected discography (as performer) 

 Delicate Fires, Redshift Records TK421 (2007/2012) (with Rachel Kiyo Iwaasa, piano, as Tiresias Duo) 
 Different Stones, Redshift Records TK422 (2009)
 Trade Winds, Redshift Records TK428 (2013)  (with Rachel Kiyo Iwaasa, piano, as Tiresias Duo)
 Sins and Fantasies, Redshift Records TK430 (2013)
 Immersion, Redshift Records TK441 (2016)
 Rosetta Stone, Redshift Records TK461 (2018)
 Lutalica, Redshift Records TK468 (2019)
 Scratches of the Wind, Redshift Records TK500

Selected discography (as producer) 
 Delicate Fires, Redshift Records TK421 (2007/2012) (co-producer with Rachel Kiyo Iwaasa) 
 Different Stones, Redshift Records TK422 (2009)
 Cosmophony, Redshift Records TK423 (2010) (co-producer with Rachel Kiyo Iwaasa) 
 Trade Winds, Redshift Records TK428 (2013)  (co-producer with Emma Lain Fernandez, David Simpson, and Rachel Kiyo Iwaasa)
 Sins and Fantasies, Redshift Records TK430 (2013) (co-produced with Don Harder)
 Concentric Lines, Redshift Records TK450 (2017)
 Lutalica, Redshift Records TK468 (2019)
 The Lake, Centrediscs (recorded 2018 for upcoming release)

Awards and nominations

Friends of Canadian Music Award 

 2021 Recipient

Western Canadian Music Awards 
Classical Artist of the Year
 Won: Lutalica (2020)

Classical Recording of the Year
 Nominated: Delicate Fires (2008)
 Nominated: Different Stones (2010) 
 Nominated: Sins and Fantasies (2015)

References

External links 
 

1972 births
Living people
Canadian flautists
University of British Columbia alumni
University of Sydney alumni
Academic staff of the University of Victoria